Occoneechee Mountain State Natural Area is a North Carolina state park in Orange County, North Carolina in the United States.

History

Researchers believe that the area's habitat has remained relatively unchanged since the last ice age due to the presence of the brown elfin, a rare butterfly, and several unique plant species. When the Piedmont's habitat underwent enormous transformations after the Ice Age, the area became unable to support the brown elfin and other species more accustomed to cooler environments. Brown elfins, believed to have once populated the Piedmont, were restricted to the state's mountains. However, the brown elfin butterflies at Occoneechee Mountain remained.

The land the state natural area now sits on was originally settled by the Occaneechi Band of the Saponi Nation, who traveled to the mountain from the west. In the colonial period, European immigrants settled the area. Until 1987, a mill village occupied a section of the natural area. The NC Division of Parks and Recreation first purchased land at Occoneechee Mountain in December 1997. Since then, the natural area has grown to

Recreation
Occoneechee Mountain State Natural Area features over 3 miles of trails, as well as fishing and picnic areas. The park's trail network also connects to the paved Hillsborough Riverwalk trail, which extends east along the Eno River towards downtown Hillsborough.

Nearby state parks
The following state parks are within  of Occoneechee Mountain State Natural Area:
Eno River State Park
Falls Lake State Recreation Area
Jordan Lake State Recreation Area
William B. Umstead State Park

References

External links
 
 Aerial View of the Occoneechee Mtn. Overlook and Eno River - Hillsborough, NC

Mountains of North Carolina
State parks of North Carolina
Protected areas of Orange County, North Carolina
Protected areas established in 1997
Landforms of Orange County, North Carolina
Inselbergs of Piedmont (United States)
1997 establishments in North Carolina